Patricio Sayegh (born 28 December 1967) is an Argentine former professional association footballer who was part of the 1988–89 championship squad at Maccabi Haifa.

Biography

Playing career
In 1988, Maccabi Haifa decided to bring in Jewish players from Argentina since they would qualify as immigrants and not as transfers. The Jewish Agency for Israel paid for travel and some living expenses for new immigrants. Sayegh was brought in under these circumstances, along with Fabian Grimberg and Fabian Lagman.

References

External links
 Profile and short biography of Patricio Sayegh on Maccabi Haifa's official website 
 Patricio Sayegh at BDFA.com.ar 

1967 births
Living people
Argentine Jews
Jewish Argentine sportspeople
Jewish footballers
Argentine footballers
San Lorenzo de Almagro footballers
Argentine emigrants to Israel
Israeli footballers
Maccabi Haifa F.C. players
Hapoel Haifa F.C. players
Maccabi Daliyat al-Karmel F.C. players
Hapoel Tirat HaCarmel F.C. players
Liga Leumit players
Israeli people of Argentine-Jewish descent
Sportspeople of Argentine descent
Maccabi Ironi Kiryat Ata F.C. managers
Beitar Tel Aviv Bat Yam F.C. managers
Hapoel Ramat Gan F.C. managers
Maccabi Herzliya F.C. managers
Association football forwards
Argentine football managers